The Samsung Galaxy J4+ (Samsung Galaxy J4 Plus) is an Android smartphone manufactured by Samsung Electronics. It was unveiled on September 19, 2018 and was released the month after.

Specifications

Hardware 
The Galaxy J4+ is powered by an Snapdragon 425 SoC including a quad-core 1.4 GHz ARM Cortex-A53 CPU, an Adreno 308 GPU with 2 or 3 GB RAM and either 16 or 32 GB of internal storage which can be upgraded up to 256 GB via microSD card.

It has a 6.0-inch TFT LCD display with a HD Ready resolution. The 13 MP rear camera has f/1.9 aperture and features autofocus, LED flash, HDR and Full HD video. The front camera has 5 MP with f/2.2 aperture.

Software 
The Galaxy J4+ is shipped with Android 8.1 "Oreo" and Samsung's Experience user interface. In January 2019 an update to 9.0 "Pie" and One UI was announced which became available in April 2019.

See also 

 Samsung Galaxy
 Samsung Galaxy J series
 Samsung Galaxy J3 (2018)
 Samsung Galaxy J2 Core
 Samsung Galaxy J4 Core
 Samsung Galaxy J6
 Samsung Galaxy J6+
 Samsung Galaxy J8

References

External links 

Samsung Galaxy
Samsung smartphones
Android (operating system) devices
Mobile phones introduced in 2018